The women's 400 metre individual medley competition of the swimming events at the 2019 Pan American Games was held on August 9, 2019, at the Villa Deportiva Nacional Videna cluster.

Records
Prior to this competition, the existing world and Pan American Games records were as follows:

Results

Heats
The first round was held on August 9.

Final B
The B final was also held on August 9.

Final A
The A final was also held on August 9.

References

Swimming at the 2019 Pan American Games
2019 in women's swimming